Trechus alinae is a species of ground beetle in the subfamily Trechinae. It was described by Dajoz in 1990.

References

alinae
Beetles described in 1990